The women's individual pursuit class C1–3 track cycling event at the 2020 Summer Paralympics took place on 25 August 2021 at the Izu Velodrome, Japan. This class (C) is for the cyclist who has impairments that affect their legs, arms, and/or trunk but are still capable to use a standard bicycle. There will be 15 cyclists from 11 nations competing.

Competition format
The competition begins with a qualifying round where the 15 cyclists are divided into 8 heats with 2 cyclists each except heat 1 which will only contain 1 cyclist; they compete on a time trial basis. The 2 fastest in the qualifying round would qualify to the gold medal final while the 3rd and 4th fastest will qualify to the bronze medal final. The distance of this event is 3000m. The event finals are held on the same day as the qualifying.

Schedule
All times are Japan Standard Time (UTC+9)

Results

Qualifying

Finals

References

Women's pursuit C1-3